Arnold Hill may refer to:

Arnold Hill, West Virginia, an unincorporated community in Randolph County
Arnold Hill Academy, a mixed secondary school and sixth form located in the county of Nottinghamshire, England

See also
Arnold Hills (1857–1927), English businessman, sportsman, philanthropist, and promoter of vegetarianism